Pheraeus is a genus of skippers in the family Hesperiidae.

Species
Recognised species in the genus Pheraeus include:
 Pheraeus odilia (Plötz, 1884)

References

Natural History Museum Lepidoptera genus database

Hesperiinae
Hesperiidae genera